Livin' in the Scope is the second studio album by American Chicago-based hip hop group Snypaz. It was released on May 22, 2001 via Rap-A-Lot Records. Production was handled by L.A., Channel 7, Hurt-M-Badd, Mike Dean, Mr. Lee, Domo and The Legendary Traxster, with J. Prince serving as executive producer. It features guest appearances from AK-47 of Do Or Die and The Regime. The album peaked at No. 174 on the Billboard 200, No. 41 on the Top R&B/Hip-Hop Albums and No. 8 on the Heatseekers Albums in the United States.

Track listing

Charts

References

External links

2001 albums
Snypaz albums
Virgin Records albums
Rap-A-Lot Records albums
Albums produced by Hurt-M-Badd
Albums produced by The Legendary Traxster
Albums produced by Mike Dean (record producer)